Bogdanovich is a Slavic surname found across the Slavic speaking world, meaning "son of Bogdan", spelt Богданович transliterated Bogdanovich (Russian) or Bohdanovych (Ukrainian), Bahdanovič (Belarusian), Bogdanowicz (Polish), and Богдановић transliterated Bogdanović (Serbian).

People with this name
Alex Bogdanović (b. 1984), British tennis player of Serbian descent
Angel Bogdanovich (1860-1907) Russian literary critic and social activist
Bogdan Bogdanović (architect) (1922–2010), Serbian architect and politician
Bogdan Bogdanović (basketball) (b. 1992), Serbian basketball player who currently plays for the Atlanta Hawks
Bojan Bogdanović (b. 1989), Herzegovinian-born Croatian basketballer 
Dimitrije Bogdanović (1930–1986), Serbian historian
Dušan Bogdanović (b. 1955), Serbian-born American composer and classical guitarist
Daniel Bogdanovic (b. 1980), Maltese footballer of Serbian descent
Edmund Bogdanowicz (1859–1911), Polish poet, writer and journalist
Goran Bogdanović (b. 1967), retired Serbian footballer
Ippolit Bogdanovich (1743–1803), Russian poet
Maksim Bahdanovič (1891–1917), Belarusian poet
Modest Ivanovitch Bogdanovich (1805–1882), Russian general
Peter Bogdanovich (1939–2022), American film director, writer, and actor of Serbian descent
Rade Bogdanović (b. 1970), Serbian footballer
Samiilo Bohdanovych-Zarudny or Samuel Zarudny Bogdanowicz, 17th century Cossack diplomat and judge
Stanislav Bogdanovich (1993–2020), Ukrainian chess player
Viktor Bogdanovic (b. 1981), Swiss-born American comic book artist

See also
Bogdani 
Bogdanov
Bogdanovich (town), a town in Sverdlovsk Oblast, Russia

Theophoric names
Patronymic surnames
Serbian surnames
Croatian surnames